Alla tiders Melodifestival (All-time Melodifestival) was a gala show organised by SVT to celebrate fifty years of the Eurovision Song Contest and the Swedish selection for it, Melodifestivalen. It was filmed at Cirkus in Stockholm on 21 March 2005 and was broadcast over SVT1 on 8 April the same year. The ten songs performed were chosen by an online public vote to raise money for Världens barn.

Songs

See also
Congratulations: 50 Years of the Eurovision Song Contest

References

External links
TV broadcastings at SVT's open archive

Melodifestivalen
2005 in Swedish music
2005 in Swedish television
2005 song contests
Nostalgia television shows
March 2005 events in Europe
Events in Stockholm